is a Japanese anime television series adaptation of the Nintendo Switch game named Fitness Boxing. The series was produced by Japanese studios Imagineer and Story Effect, and it aired from October to December 2021.

Characters

Broadcast
On August 26, 2021, an anime television series adaptation produced by Imagineer and Story Effect was announced. The series was directed and written by Junpei Morita, with motion capture by SOLID CUBE and music composed by Yūsuke Shirato. It aired from October 1 to December 17, 2021 on Tokyo MX. The series ran for 12 episodes and each episode is 5 minutes long.

Episode list

References

External links

  
 Official Twitter 
 

2021 anime television series debuts
Anime television series based on video games
Boxing in anime and manga
Tokyo MX original programming